The 1991 Men's World Team Squash Championships were held in Helsinki, Finland and took place from November 12 until November 17, 1991.

Seeds

Results

Pool A

Pool B

Semi-finals

Third Place Play Off

Final

See also 
World Team Squash Championships
World Squash Federation
World Open (squash)

References 

World Squash Championships
Squash tournaments in Finland
International sports competitions hosted by Finland
Squash
Men